The American Federation of Teachers (AFT) is the second largest teacher's labor union in America (the largest being the National Education Association). The union was founded in Chicago. John Dewey and Margaret Haley were founders.

About 60 percent of AFT's membership works directly in education, with the remainder of the union's members composed of paraprofessionals and school-related personnel; local, state and federal employees; higher education faculty and staff, and nurses and other healthcare professionals. The AFT has, since its founding, affiliated with trade union federations: until 1955 the American Federation of Labor, and now the AFL–CIO.

History

AFT was founded in Chicago, Illinois, on April 15, 1916. Charles Stillman was the first president and Margaret Haley was the national organizer. On May 9, 1916, the American Federation of Labor chartered the AFT. By 1919, AFT had 100 local affiliates and a membership of approximately 11,000 teachers, which amounted to 1.5% of the nation's teaching force. In its early days, AFT distinguished itself from the National Education Association (NEA) by its exclusion of school administrators from membership. Facing opposition from politicians and boards of education, membership in AFT declined to 7,000 by 1930. During this period, the organization had little impact on local or national education policy.

AFT membership climbed during the Great Depression, reaching 33,000 by 1939. During the 1930s, AFT, whose members had historically been primary school teachers, saw influential college professors join the union. Also during the 1930s, the Communist Party gained influence within the AFT. In 1941, under pressure from the AFL, the union ejected three local unions in New York City and Philadelphia (including its prominent early member, the New York City Teachers Union, AFT Local 5) for being communist-dominated. The charter revocations represented nearly a third of the union's national membership.

The 1940s were marked by a series of teacher strikes, including 57 strikes that occurred from 1946 through 1949. By 1947, AFT had a membership of 42,000. The 1960s and 1970s also saw numerous teacher strikes, including 1,000 strikes involving more than 823,000 teachers between 1960 and 1974.

AFT membership was 59,000 in 1960, 200,000 in 1970, and 550,000 in 1980. In 2017, membership was around 1.6 million, and the union had due income of $35 million.

Since 1977, AFT has published a quarterly magazine for teachers covering various issues about children and education called American Educator. In 1998, the membership of the NEA rejected a proposed merger with AFT. The AFT's membership is half that of the NEA.

Presidents of the AFT
Albert Shanker
In 1974, Albert Shanker was elected president of AFT. He served in this role until his death on February 22, 1997. For 27 years, Shanker wrote a weekly column entitled "Where We Stand" that ran as an advertisement in The New York Times. Shanker was an early advocate of charter schools. He also called for a national competency test for teachers, merit pay for teachers, and more rigorous requirements for high school graduation. During his tenure as AFT president, Shanker was jailed twice for leading illegal strikes.

Sandra Feldman
Sandra Feldman served as AFT's president from 1997 to 2004. Feldman helped craft the No Child Left Behind Act.

Edward J. McElroy
Edward J. McElroy, the AFT's secretary-treasurer since 1992, was elected president of the AFT in 2004, replacing Feldman. On February 12, 2008, McElroy announced he would retire at the union's regularly scheduled biennial convention in July. On July 14, 2008, Randi Weingarten was elected to succeed him.

Randi Weingarten
On July 14, 2008, Randi Weingarten, then the president of the United Federation of Teachers, was elected to succeed McElroy as AFT president. In September 2008, she announced the launch of the AFT Innovation Fund, a union-led, private foundation-supported effort to provide grants to AFT unions to develop and implement innovations in education. In 2014, Weingarten announced that AFT was ending a five-year funding relationship between the Bill & Melinda Gates Foundation and the AFT Innovation Fund. According to Department of Labor filings, Weingarten earned nearly $560,000 in total compensation during the 2013–2014 school year.

Political activities
Since 1980, AFT and the NEA have contributed nearly $57.4 million to federal campaigns, an amount that is about 30 percent higher than any single corporation or other union. About 95 percent of political donations from teachers unions have gone to Democrats.

In 2008, AFT provided a campaign contribution of $1,784,808.59 to Hillary Clinton and $1,997,375.00 to Barack Obama.

In July 2015, AFT endorsed Democrat Hillary Clinton in the 2016 presidential race. Clinton and AFT president Randi Weingarten are longtime friends. AFT's official endorsement of Clinton caused controversy among some AFT members who felt that the endorsement came too soon and did not reflect the wishes of rank-and-file AFT members, some of whom supported Bernie Sanders.

Members' dues underwrite much of AFT's political activities. In 2015, four California teachers sued AFT and its California unit, the California Federation of Teachers, over the use of member dues for political activities. The plaintiffs argued that unions were violating their constitutional right to free speech by forcing them to either support union-favored causes and candidates or lose access to important job benefits such as disability and life insurance.

In 2018, the landmark Supreme Court ruling in Janus v. AFSCME resolved this matter, concluding that public sector union fees violate the First Amendment, compelling nonmembers to "subsidize private speech on matters of substantial public concern". Unions will, subsequently, need to gain the affirmative consent of individual teachers before enrolling them in the union.

Activities

Race relations
The AFT was one of the first trade unions to allow African-Americans and minorities to become full members of their trade union. In 1918, the AFT called for equal pay for African-American teachers, the election of African Americans to local school boards and compulsory school attendance for African-American children. In 1919, the AFT called for equal educational opportunities for African-American children, and in 1928 called for the social, political, economic, and cultural contributions of African Americans to be taught in the public schools.

In 1951, the union stopped chartering segregated locals. It filed an amicus brief in the 1954 U.S. Supreme Court desegregation case Brown v. Board of Education. In 1957, the AFT expelled all locals that refused to desegregate. This resulted in the loss of over 7,000 members. In 1963, the AFT actively supported the March on Washington for Jobs and Freedom.

Collective bargaining
By the late 1940s, AFT was slowly moving toward collective bargaining as an official policy. By the end of the 1970s, collective bargaining agreements covered 72% of public school teachers.

Active shooter drills
In 2020, the union along with the National Education Association issued a report expressing opposition to active shooter drills being held in schools, calling on the drills to be revised or eliminated.

Share My Lesson 
In 2012, AFT partnered with Britain's TES Connect to create a curriculum sharing website called Share My Lesson. The AFT and TES invested $10 million to develop the site.

Reception
In 2010, four American film documentaries, most notably Waiting for Superman, portrayed the AFT as hurting children by opposing charter schools and protecting incompetent teachers.

Leadership

Presidents
1916: Charles Stillman
1923: Florence Rood
1925: Mary C. Barker
1931: Henry R. Linville
1934: Raymond F. Lowry
1936: Jerome C. Davis
1939: George S. Counts
1942: John M. Fewkes
1943: Joseph F. Landis
1947: John M. Eklund
1952: Carl J. Megel
1964: Charles Cogen
1968: David Selden
1974: Albert Shanker
1997: Sandra Feldman
2004: Edward J. McElroy
2008: Randi Weingarten

Secretary-Treasurers
1916: F. G. Stecker
1926: Florence Curtis Hanson
1935: George Davis
1936: Irvin R. Kuenzli
1953: Post vacant
1963: Robert Porter
1992: Edward J. McElroy
2004: Nat LaCour
2008: Antonia Cortese
2011: Lorretta Johnson
2020: Fedrick C. Ingram

Notable AFT members
 J. Quinn Brisben, Socialist Party USA candidate for President of the United States in the 1992 U.S. presidential election
 Ralph Bunche, former United Nations Under-Secretary-General and Nobel Peace Prize winner
 Tony Danza, film and television actor
 Paul Douglas, U.S. Senator from Illinois
 John Dewey, educator
 Albert Einstein, scientist
 Michael Harrington, political activist
 Hubert Humphrey, U.S. vice-president and U.S. Senator from Minnesota
 Mike Mansfield, former United States Senate Majority Leader and U.S. Ambassador to Japan
 Frank McCourt, Pulitzer Prize-winning author
 Robert Oppenheimer, scientist
 Donna Shalala, former U.S. Representative from Florida and former United States Secretary of Health and Human Services
 Elie Wiesel, Nobel Peace Prize winner
Kshama Sawant, socialist activist and member of the Seattle City Council

Notable AFT locals and federations
Chicago Teachers Union
Cincinnati Federation of Teachers
Education Minnesota
Florida Education Association
Health Professionals and Allied Employees
Montana Federation of Public Employees
New York State United Teachers
Ohio Federation of Teachers
Professional Staff Congress (City University of New York)
Public Employees Federation (New York state)
Rhode Island Federation of Teachers and Health Professionals
Temple University Graduate Students Association
United Federation of Teachers (New York City)
United Teachers Los Angeles
United Teachers of New Orleans
University Health Professionals (Connecticut state)
Washington State Nurses Association

See also

 Coalition of Graduate Employee Unions
 Teachers Union
 Teachers Guild

References

Further reading
 Archives of Labor History. Wayne State University. An American Federation of Teachers Bibliography. Detroit: Wayne State University Press, 1980. 
 Berube, Maurice R. Teacher Politics: The Influence of Unions Vol. 26. Westport, Conn.: Greenwood Publishing Group, 1988. 
 Braun, Robert J. Teachers and Power: The Story of the American Federation of Teachers. New York: Simon & Schuster, 1972. 
 Cain, Timothy Reese. "For Education and Employment: The American Federation of Teachers and Academic Freedom, 1926–1941." History of Higher Education Annual, 26 (2007), 67–102.
 Dewing, Rolland. "The American Federation of Teachers and Desegregation," Journal of Negro Education Vol. 42, No. 1 (Winter, 1973), pp. 79–92 in JSTOR
 Eaton, William Edward. The American Federation of Teachers, 1916–1961: A History of the Movement. Urbana, IL: Southern Illinois University Press, 1975. 
 Gaffney, Dennis. Teachers United: The Rise of New York State United Teachers. Albany, N.Y.: State University of New York Press, 2007. 
 Gordon, Jane Anna. Why They Couldn't Wait: A Critique of the Black-Jewish Conflict Over Community Control in Ocean-Hill Brownsville, 1967–1971. Oxford: RoutledgeFalmer, 2001. 
 Haley, Margaret. Battleground: The Autobiography of Margaret A. Haley. Robert L. Reid, ed. Chicago: University of Illinois Press, 1982. 
 Kahlenberg, Richard. "Tough Liberal: Albert Shanker and the Battles Over Schools, Unions, Race and Democracy Columbia University Press, 2007. 
 Moe, Terry M. Special Interest: Teachers Unions and America's Public Schools (Brookings Institution Press; 2011) 513 pages; argues that teachers' unions cause serious problems with education in the US and contribute to the slowness of reform.
 Murphy, Marjorie. Blackboard Unions: The AFT and the NEA, 1900–1980. Ithaca, N.Y.: Cornell University Press, 1991. 
 O'Connor, Paula. "Grade School Teachers Become Labor Leaders." Labor's Heritage. 7:2 (Fall 1995).
 Podair, Jerald. The Strike That Changed New York: Blacks, Whites, and the Ocean Hill-Brownsville Crisis.  New Haven: Yale University Press, 2004. 
 Walter P. Reuther Library, Wayne State University. AFT Historical Timeline. No date. Accessed June 18, 2006.
 Knudsen, Andrew. Communism, Anti-Communism, and Faculty Unionization: The American Federation of Teachers Union at the University of Washington, 1935–1948, Great Depression in Washington State Project, 2009.

Archives
 AFT official archives. Walter P. Reuther Library, Wayne State University. Detroit, Michigan
 American Federation of Teachers Local 200 Records. 1927-1982. 11.05 cubic feet.
 American Federation of Teachers Local 200 Photograph Collection. approximately 1964-1975. 69 photographic prints (1 box) ; various sizes, 12 negatives.
 American Federation of Teachers, Local 336 Records. 1948-1978. 0.42 cubic feet.
 American Federation of Teachers Local 772 Records. 1963-1982. 1.14 cubic feet.
 American Federation of Teachers Local 401 Records. 1936-1949. 1 volume plus approximately 214 items.
 Washington State Federation of Teachers Records. 1937-2006. 22.39 cubic feet.
 American Federation of Teachers, Yakima Local 1485 Records. 1969-1997. 12 cubic feet.
 AFT Antecedents to Historical Reform, a digital library project to host primary resources from the AFT historical collections in the Walter P. Reuther Library that document various education reform initiatives that union and school boards have collaborated on from 1983 to present.

External links

 
 The Washington State Teacher (1945–1951), from The Labor Press Project
AFT on OpenSecrets
American Federation of Teachers Oral History Collection, Tamiment Library & Robert F. Wagner Labor Archives, New York University
Tamiment Library and Robert F. Wagner Labor Archives Printed Ephemera Collection on the American Federation of Teachers, Tamiment Library & Robert F. Wagner Labor Archives, New York University
Joyce Wheeler American Federation of Teachers Papers, Tamiment Library & Robert F. Wagner Labor Archives, New York University

 
1916 establishments in the United States
AFL–CIO
Education trade unions
Education International
Public Services International
Education-related professional associations
Teacher associations based in the United States
Educational organizations based in Washington, D.C.